James Kelly (1916 – 3 April 1985) was an Irish hurler who played as a midfielder for the Kilkenny senior team.

Born in Carrickshock, County Kilkenny, Kelly first arrived on the inter-county scene when he first linked up with the Kilkenny senior team. He made his debut in the 1938 championship and immediately became a regular member of the team. During his career he won two All-Ireland medals and six Leinster medals. He was an All-Ireland runner-up on three occasions.

Kelly also represented the Leinster inter-provincial team on a number of occasions, winning one Railway Cup medal. At club level he won six championship medals with Carrickshock.

His retirement came following Kilkenny's defeat by Laois in the 1949 championship.

Honours

Team

Carrickshock
Kilkenny Senior Hurling Championship (6): 1938 1940 1941 1942 1943 1951

Kilkenny
All-Ireland Senior Hurling Championship (2): 1939, 1947
Leinster Senior Hurling Championship (6): 1939, 1940, 1943, 1945, 1946, 1947

Leinster
Railway Cup (1): 1941

References

1916 births
1985 deaths
Carrickshock hurlers
Kilkenny inter-county hurlers
Leinster inter-provincial hurlers
All-Ireland Senior Hurling Championship winners